Itha Innu Muthal is a 1984 Indian Malayalam-language comedy film directed by Reji (T. S. Suresh Babu), starring Shankar, Sreenath, Maniyanpilla Raju, Ranipadmini, with extended cameos by Mammootty and Mohanlal. The movie .

Plot
Widowed Nair, who owns a firm, lived with his only daughter, Sindhu. Nair's nephew, Gopi eyes to marry Sindhu. After knowing Gopi's intentions, Sindhu elopes with her lover Shankar.

Cast

Shankar as Shankar
Sreenath as Gopi/Jimmy Fernandez 
Rani Padmini as Nimmy
Bhuvana Saravana as Sindhu 
Uma Bharani as Sharada
Jagathy Sreekumar as Kundera Kuttappan
Sukumari as Gopi's mother
Adoor Bhasi as T. P. Bhaskaran Nair
Poojappura Ravi as Ravi
Santhakumari as Santhamma
Bheeman Raghu as Rajkumar
V. D. Rajappan as Thacholi Thankappan
Maniyanpilla Raju as Raju
Mammootty as Jayamohan
Mohanlal as Mohanlal
Ramu as Ramu
Santhosh as Santhosh 
Kunchan as Kunju

Soundtrack
The music was composed by Shyam and the lyrics were written by Chunakkara Ramankutty.

Trivia
This is the debut release of director T. S. Suresh Babu and his name was shown as "Reji" in title card, which he later rechristened.

References

External links
 

1984 films
1980s Malayalam-language films
1984 directorial debut films
Indian comedy films
Films directed by T. S. Suresh Babu